Araceli Castro is a paralympic athlete from Mexico competing mainly in category F41 throwing events.

Araceli's Paralympic games career began in 1988 where she was part of the Mexican class 2-6 4 × 200 m relay team that won a silver medal.  Four years later in Barcelona in 1992 she was again part of the Mexican relay team, this time over 100m and this time winning a bronze, she also competed in all three individual throwing events winning bronze in both the discus and javelin.  The 1996 Summer Paralympics didn't prove quite so successful as despite again competing in all three throws Araceli only managed one medal, but it was her best finish in an individual event with a silver in the discus.  After missing the 2000 Summer Paralympics she again competed in the 2004 Summer Paralympics but was unable to add to her medal tally in either the javelin or shot put.

References

External links
 

Paralympic athletes of Mexico
Athletes (track and field) at the 1988 Summer Paralympics
Athletes (track and field) at the 1992 Summer Paralympics
Athletes (track and field) at the 1996 Summer Paralympics
Athletes (track and field) at the 2004 Summer Paralympics
Paralympic silver medalists for Mexico
Paralympic bronze medalists for Mexico
Living people
Medalists at the 1988 Summer Paralympics
Medalists at the 1992 Summer Paralympics
Medalists at the 1996 Summer Paralympics
Year of birth missing (living people)
Paralympic medalists in athletics (track and field)
Mexican female discus throwers
Mexican female javelin throwers
Mexican female shot putters
Discus throwers with limb difference
Javelin throwers with limb difference
Shot putters with limb difference
Paralympic discus throwers
Paralympic javelin throwers
Paralympic shot putters
20th-century Mexican women